No. 276 Squadron RAF was a Royal Air Force Squadron formed as an air-sea rescue unit in World War II.

History

Formation in World War II
The squadron formed at  RAF Harrowbeer, Devon on 21 October 1941 equipped with the Lysander and Walrus, with the responsibility of Air Sea Rescue over the Western part of the English Channel and the Bristol Channel. Hurricanes, Defiants, Spitfires  and Ansons were then supplied, the fighter aircraft being used for spotting downed aircrew at sea and for dropping dinghies to the downed airmen.

Warwicks which could drop lifeboats were operated from April 1944 until they were transferred to No. 277 Squadron RAF. A detachment and then the whole squadron relocated to Querqueville, France, and then Belgium following the Normandy landings. The squadron then moved to Kjevik, Norway, on 23 August 1945 and it returned to RAF Dunsfold on 10 November 1945 where it disbanded on 14 November 1945.

Aircraft operated

References

External links

 History of No.'s 276–280 Squadrons at RAF Web
 276 Squadron history on the official RAF website

276
Military units and formations established in 1941